Child labour in Switzerland was a fact in rural areas to the 1960s, at least tolerated by the Swiss authorities referring to the so-called Verdingkinder, as up to 100,000 children were needed as cheap workers mostly on farms the decades before.

Definition 
Referring to the employment of children in any work that deprives children of their childhood, interferes with their ability to attend regular school, and that is mentally, physically, socially or morally dangerous and harmful. As of the 2010s, the practice of Child labour in principle is still tolerated, as at least small family-owned farms in Switzerland do need the help of their children on occasion of the harvests in late summer. That is the reason why in the more rural cantons there are still much longer summer holidays, granted by the governmental public schools, then in the urbanized cantons where there are usually five weeks summer holidays in July and August.

19th century: Industrialization 

As in many other countries, child labour affected among the so-called Kaminfegerkinder ("chimney sweep children") also children working p.e. in spinning mills, factories and in agriculture in 19th-century Switzerland. In the Swiss pre-industrial society, as well in other European countries, the children often were part of the family economy, earlier were integrated into the worker process and often indispensable contributed income. The industrialization forced family members to look for an income outside the traditional housekeeping. Work on the machines was often easy and physically not very challenging, what favoured the 'use' of women and children. Thus, the exploitation of the labor of children took new forms and extended dimensions, and spread at the beginning of the 19th century rapidly, particularly in the canton of Zurich and in Eastern Switzerland. In the cotton mills, six- to ten-year-old children worked in miserable conditions, up to 16 hours per day and often at night. Child labour became a social problem on which the authorities responded with investigations, so in 1812 in the canton of St. Gallen and one year later in the canton of Zürich. In the latter, the regulation because of underage youth at all and the spinning machines especially (In German: Verordnung wegen der minderjährigen Jugend überhaupt und an den Spinnmaschinen besonders) was issued in 1815; night work and factory work before the finished ninth birthday was prohibited and the daily working time limited on 12 to 14 hours. These rules were not to enforce in practice but marked the beginning of the child protection legislation, followed by laws in Zürich (1837) and in the other cantons.

20th century in Switzerland

In general 
The Federal factory act (German: Eidgenössisches Fabrikgesetz) of 1877 regulated the factory work for the first time nationally and introduced a ban on work by children below the age of 14. The factory law applied only to the factory industry. So there were no legal provisions, an attempt was made to limit child labour by the compulsory school law, however, it remained still widely used at the beginning of the 20th century, especially in the agriculture and the home work (contract, German: Verding). According to a survey of 1904, in twelve cantons around 300,000 child laborer still worked in Switzerland.

'Verdingkinder' and 'Kinder der Landstrasse' 

Verdingkinder (literally: "contract children" or "indentured child laborers") were children who were taken from their parents, often due to poverty or moral reasons – usually mothers being unmarried, very poor citizens, of Gypsy–Yeniche origin, so-called Kinder der Landstrasse, etc. – and sent to live with 'new families', often poor farmers who needed cheap laborers. There were even Verdingkinder auctions where children were handed over to the farmer asking least money from the authorities, thus securing cheap labour for his farm and relieving the authority from the financial burden of looking after the children. In the 1930s 20% of all agricultural laborers in the Canton of Bern were children below the age of 15. Swiss municipality guardianship authorities acted so, commonly tolerated by federal authorities, to the 1960s, not all of them of course, but usually communities affected of low taxes in some Swiss cantons The Swiss historian Marco Leuenberger investigated, that in 1930 there were some 35,000 indentured children, and between 1920 and 1970 more than 100,000 are believed to have been placed with families or homes.< 10,000 Verdingkinder, women and men, are still alive, therefore the so-called Wiedergutmachungsinitiative was started in April 2014. The collection of targeted at least authenticated 100,000 signatures of Swiss citizens have to be collected to October 2015.

Legal restrictions 
In the course of the 20th century, the child labour in Switzerland was successively further restricted: the Federal law of 1922 (German: Bundesgesetz von 1922 über die Beschäftigung von jugendlichen und weiblichen Personen in den Gewerben) referred to young people and 'female persons' in the trades, increased the minimum age to 14 years and prohibited night work for people under the age of 19, and apprentices under the age of 20. The Federal law of 1938 (German: Bundesgesetz über das Mindestalter der Arbeitnehmer) increased the minimum age of workers to 15 years, and the Federal law of 1940 (German: Bundesgesetz über die Heimarbeit) forbade the awarding of an independent home work on children under the age of 15 years. In 1964, the scope of the occupational safety and health in the labour code was extended, but agriculture and home work still were excluded. The protection of Verdingkinder was legalized by the revision of the child law of 1978. In 1997 respectively 1999 the UN Convention on the rights of the child was signed, and Switzerland participated at the International Programme on the Elimination of Child Labour (IPEC) of the International Labour Organization since 1991. In 2006, the age of consent for night work and Sunday work was raised to 18 years.

See also 
 Kaminfegerkinder
 Kinder der Landstrasse
 Verdingkinder
 Wiedergutmachungsinitiative

Literature 
 Hans R Wiedmer: Arbeit im Industrialisierungsprozess: Veränderungen industrieller Arbeitsbedingungen in der Schweiz 1880-1914. Chronos 1989, .
 C. Franz Waldner: Die Heimarbeit aus rechtlicher und historischer Sicht. 1994, . 
 Paul Hugger: Kind sein in der Schweiz: Eine Kulturgeschichte der frühen Jahre. Offizin Verlag 1998, .

References

External links 

 
 Schweizerische Bundesverwaltung: Übereinkommen Nr. 182 über das Verbot und unverzügliche Massnahmen zur Beseitigung der schlimmsten Formen der Kinderarbeit 

 
Youth in Switzerland
Social history of Switzerland
Economy of Switzerland
Human rights abuses in Switzerland